Novigrad is a town in Istria County in western Croatia. It is also sometimes referred to as Novigrad Istarski to distinguish it from three other Croatian towns of the same name.

At the 2011 census the town proper had a population of 2,622, while the administrative area – which also includes four nearby villages – had 4,345 inhabitants. 66% of population were ethnic Croats while the biggest minority group were Istrian Italians (10%).

History 
There was an ancient city in the broad area of what is now Novigrad, which was called Aemona. In the 5th-6th centuries Novigrad was called Neapolis (Greek Νεάπολις). From the early Middle Ages and right up until 1828 it was the seat of the Diocese of Novigrad, which has been identified with the Ancient see of Aemona and nominally restored as Latin Catholic titular see under both names. From 1270 it was under the rule of the Venetian Republic, which gave it the Italian name of Cittanova, until Venice fell in the late 18th century. According to the 1921 census, there were no Croats in Novigrad.

Novigrad today 

Situated on a peninsula, Novigrad has retained its medieval structure and layout, with narrow, winding streets and small shops. The fortifications belong to the medieval era: the town wall still stands with its battlements and two round towers. There are examples of secular architecture from the time of the Venetian empire, such as the town loggia and several houses built in Venetian Gothic style.

The present church was built in the 15th and 16th centuries on the foundations of the 8th-century basilica of Saint Pelagius that had a nave and two aisles. Under the present presbytery is a late Romanesque crypt. In the sacristy are 15th-century antiphonaries with beautiful simple initials.

Novigrad was the host of the 2016 nine-pin bowling Single's World Championships.

Demographics 

According to the 2011 census, Novigrad had 2,622 residents, with a total municipal population of 4,345.

Ethnic Croats comprised 66.42% of the total population, followed by Italians (10.20%), Albanians (3.36%), Serbs (2.83%) and Slovenes (2.09%), while 10.66% of the population was regionally affiliated. Italians in Novigrad are organised in an association with the objective of preserving and promoting the specificity of the Italian community.

The Town of Novigrad consists of following settlements:

 Antenal, population 152
 Bužinija (Businia), population 936
 Dajla (Daila), population 396
 Mareda, population 239
Novigrad (Cittanova), population 2,662

References

External links 

  

Cities and towns in Croatia
Populated coastal places in Croatia
Populated places in Istria County
Italian-speaking territorial units in Croatia